Eumorpha obliquus is a moth of the  family Sphingidae. It is found from Belize, Guatemala, Nicaragua and Costa Rica south to Bolivia. It is also present in Brazil and Guadeloupe.

The wingspan is 130–136 mm. It is similar to Eumorpha anchemolus, but the forewing is shorter, broader with an even outer margin. There is a strong contrast between the generally light basal half and the generally dark apical half of the forewing upperside. The underside of the body and wings is yellowish.

Adults are on wing year round.

The larvae feed on grape species. The larvae of subspecies guadelupensis have been recorded feeding on Cissus sicyoides.

Subspecies 
 Eumorpha obliquus obliquus (Belize, Guatemala, Nicaragua and Costa Rica south to Bolivia)
 Eumorpha obliquus guadelupensis (Chalumeau & Delplanque, 1974) (Guadeloupe)
 Eumorpha obliquus orientis (Daniel, 1949) (Brazil)

References 

Eumorpha
Moths described in 1903
Moths of Guadeloupe